Gloeocapsa (from the Greek gloia (gelatinous) and the Latin capsa (case)) is a genus of cyanobacteria. The cells secrete individual gelatinous sheaths which can often be seen as sheaths around recently divided cells within outer sheaths. Recently divided cell pairs often appear to be only one cell since the new cells cohere temporarily. They are also known as glow caps, a term derived from the yellowish hue given off by the cap.

Occurrence
Some species of this genus are halophiles and hence found in hypersaline lakes and other high salinity environments. An example of such occurrence of the genus is in the Makgadikgadi Pans of Botswana. Gloeocapsa magma is noted for colonising roof shingles in the United States and Canada. Fossilized Gloeocapsa have been dated from as early as 1.5 billion years ago, found in the Ural mountains in Russia.

References
Gloeocapsa Bacteria plus more Bacteria: Gloeocapsa (2008)
C. Michael Hogan (2008) Makgadikgadi, The Megalithic Portal, ed. Andy Burnham

Line notes

Chroococcales
Cyanobacteria genera